The  is a four-axle Bo-Bo wheel arrangement diesel-hydraulic locomotive type operated in Japan as a self-propelled snowplough unit since 1961 by the national railway company Japanese National Railways (JNR), and later by East Japan Railway Company (JR East) and West Japan Railway Company (JR West).

Variants
A total of 50 locomotives were built between 1961 and 1966, divided into the following sub-classes.
 Class DD15-0: 46 locomotives built between 1961 and 1965
 Class DD15-300 4 locomotives built in 1966 with modified gearing

Design
The Class DD15 was developed from the Class DD13 locomotive design, with the addition of snowplough units at either end. The snowplough units could be detached, allowing the locomotives to be used for shunting and other duties outside the winter periods. However, with the snowplough units mounted, the locomotive axle load was nearly 16 t, restricting use on rural lines, and so the class was superseded by the later Class DE15 locomotives, which had separate snowplough units. As with the Class DD13 locomotives, the Class DD15 had two  DMF31SB diesel engines.

History

DD15-0

46 Class DD15-0 locomotives were built between 1961 and 1965 by Nippon Sharyo, with the first locomotive delivered in November 1961.

, six Class DD15-0 locomotives remain in service.

DD15-300
Four Class DD15-300 locomotives were built in 1966 by Nippon Sharyo. These locomotives had a modified gear ratio, changed from 1:3.143 to 1:3.196.

, no Class DD15-300 locomotives remain in service.

Fleet status
At the time of privatization of Japanese National Railways (JNR) on 1 April 1987, 32 Class DD15 locomotives remained in service, with JR East receiving 19 and JR West receiving 13. By 1 April 1995, 25 locomotives were still in service, operated by JR East and JR West, including two DD15-300 locomotives.

, six locomotives remain in service, all operated by JR West.

Preserved examples
, three Class DD15 locomotives are preserved.
 DD15 17: Preserved at the Mikasa Railway Park in Mikasa, Hokkaido
 DD15 30: Preserved at the Tsuyama Railroad Educational Museum in Tsuyama, Okayama (Built in 1964, Previously operated by Toyama Chiho Railway, and moved to Tsuyama following its withdrawal in 2011.)
 DD15 37: Preserved at the Otaru Museum in Otaru, Hokkaido

Classification

The DD15 classification for this locomotive type is explained below.
 D: Diesel locomotive
 D: Four driving axles
 15: Locomotive with maximum speed of 85 km/h or less

References

Diesel locomotives of Japan
DD15
DD15
Bo-Bo locomotives
1067 mm gauge locomotives of Japan
Railway locomotives introduced in 1961
Nippon Sharyo locomotives